Saliba Street, (شارع صليبة), which literally means "Cross Street", is one of the old main streets in Islamic Cairo, Egypt. It runs from the Cairo Citadel in the north to the Mosque of Ibn Tulun in the south. The street is the site of many old buildings, including schools, mosques, hospitals, and mausoleums. Saliba Street is the location of the largest mosque in Cairo, Ibn Tulun Mosque, which is one of the few remaining Abbasid Mosques found in Cairo after the burning of the Fustat.

Monuments of the Street
Al-Sayeda Zainab Mosque
Gayer-Anderson Museum
Tomb of Salar and Sangar-al-Gawli
Madrasa of Sarghatmish

See also
Muizz Street
History of Egypt

 
Streets in Cairo
Tourist attractions in Cairo
Open-air museums in Egypt
Medieval Cairo